Anna Mitgutsch (born 2 October 1948) is an Austrian writer and educator. Her name also appears as Waltraud Anna Mitgutsch.

Biography
She was born in Linz and studied German and English literature at the University of Salzburg. Originally a Roman Catholic, Mitgutsch converted to Judaism and worked on a kibbutz in Israel. She taught at the Institute for American Studies at the University of Innsbruck and, after going to England, at the University of Hull and University of East Anglia. Next, She taught for a year in Seoul, South Korea and then at colleges and universities in the United States from 1979 until 1985, when Mitgutsch returned to Austria. She lives in Linz and divides her time between that city and Boston.

Her first novel was Three Daughters (Die Züchtigung) (1985), followed by The Other Face (Das andere Gesicht) in 1986. In 1989, she published Exclusion (Ausgrenzung) and, in 1992, In Foreign Cities (In fremden Städten). Her novels deal with individuals facing difficulties in becoming part of a society that is indifferent or antagonistic to them. Her work also explores the connections between the present and the past. Several of her novels have been translated into English.  Mitgutsch's novels often make the reader feel uncomfortable.

Awards 
 Brüder-Grimm-Preis der Stadt Hanau (1985)
 Cultural Prize of the State of Upper Austria (1986)
 Claassen-Rose Prize (1986)
 Prize of the city of Bozen (1990)
 Anton Wildgans Prize (1992)
 Prize of the Austrian Federal Ministry of Literature and Art (1995)
 Solothurner Literaturpreis (2001)

References 

1948 births
Living people
20th-century Austrian novelists
Austrian women novelists
Anton Wildgans Prize winners
Converts to Judaism from Roman Catholicism
Jewish novelists
Austrian Jews
20th-century women writers